Doris pseudoargus is a species of sea slug, a dorid nudibranch, a marine gastropod mollusk in the family Dorididae.

Distribution
This species was described from Le Havre, Seine-Maritime, France. A neotype was designated in 2002 based on a specimen from Locmariaquer, Atlantic coast of France. It has been reported from Norway south to the Mediterranean Sea. It can be found on the lower shore, and offshore to 300 m.

Description
Doris pseudoargus can reach 120 mm in length. It is oval and firm. The mantle is variously mottled and blotched with yellow, green, brown, and red and coarsely tuberculate. Its rhinophores are short and conical.

Ecology
Doris pseudoargus mainly feeds on the sponge Halichondria panicea.

References

External links
 

Dorididae
Gastropods described in 1827